Landolfi is an Italian surname, which is derived from the given name Landolfo or Landulf, which in turn is composed of the German words land ("land") and wulf ("wolf"). The name may refer to:

Carlo Ferdinando Landolfi (1714–1787), Italian luthier 
Lino Landolfi (1925–1988), Italian cartoonist
Mario Landolfi (born 1959), Italian politician
Tommaso Landolfi (1908–1979), Italian writer
Idolina Landolfi, Italian novelist
Juan Landolfi (1914–?), Argentine footballer

References

Italian-language surnames